Francis Merewether (c. 1674 – 1718), of Bulkington, Keevil, Wiltshire, was an English politician.

He was High Sheriff of Wiltshire for 1699–1700.

He was a Member (MP) of the Parliament of England for Devizes from February to November 1701 and in the period 3 March 1703 – 1705.

References

1674 births
1718 deaths
People from Wiltshire
English MPs 1701
English MPs 1702–1705
High Sheriffs of Wiltshire